Robert Alan Lees (born June 2, 1959 in Fort Gordon, Georgia) is a retired Korea Baseball Organization infielder.

Career
After graduating in 1977 from Venice High School (Venice, Florida), Robert Lees made the Florida A&M University Baseball Team as a walk on. Lees made the roster for the 1978 season, however was hampered by a nagging calf injury and spent the majority of the season on injured reserve.

Lees left FAMU in 1979 after limited playing time and attempted to make it in the minor leagues. Lees played half a season for the Tacoma Tigers seeing limited playing time. In 1979 Lees put his professional career on hold and enlisted in the US ARMY. Lees served 4 years in the US ARMY stationed primarily in Camp Humphries, South Korea. as well as various semi-pro teams in South Korea.

In 1982 Lees received an honorable discharge from the US ARMY and received an invitation to tryout for the Samsung Lions. Lees impressed scouts and received an offer to play in the inaugural season of the Korea Baseball Organization. Then-president Chun Doo-hwan threw the first pitch. Lees saw action as a pinch runner in the 5th inning. Lees saw limited playing time through the season and after one year in the KBO, Lees officially retired from professional baseball.

In 2001 Lees was hired as an assistant coach for the Gulf Coast League Braves. Lees was not retained following the 2001 season. Robert Lees is of Korean/American descent and was the first Korean/American player in the KBO. Lees currently resides in Clermont, Florida and is married with 2 children. Lees currently run coaches clinics in central Florida.

References

Official Game Program Samsung Lions vs. MBC Chungyon, March 27, 1982. pg10
Stars And Stripes, July 25, 1980, "Meet the stars next door", pg. 4

1959 births
Living people
Baseball players from Augusta, Georgia